Songs is the first official album by American lo-fi musician John Maus, released on June 27, 2006 by the British label Upset the Rhythm. The album was recorded over the course of five years. It consists of slightly remixed tracks that originally appeared on the self-released albums Snowless Winters EP (1999), Love Letters From Hell (2000), and I Want to Live! (2003).

Reception

Upon release, the album generally drew negative reviews from critics. CMJ stated, "It took this Ariel Pink cohort five years to write and record his debut album, and only five minutes to become more annoying than Ariel Pink." Tiny Mix Tapes gave the LP a four-star review, in which they wrote that Maus's singing "is always an effortless balance between weird visceral descriptions, deadpan humor and the uncomfortably honest."

Track listing

See also
 Lover Boy

References 

2006 debut albums
John Maus albums